Vuyo Mbuli (14 May 1967 – 19 May 2013) was a South African television personality and news presenter at  Morning Live, He became working as an anchor at SABC in 1993 with Tracy O'Brien and then working on the debut show Morning Live in 1999 until his death.

Mbuli died at the age of 46 after collapsing in the Free State Stadium in Bloemfontein while watching a rugby match.

Career
Mbuli worked for state broadcaster SABC and made his television debut in 1993 for TopSport Surplus (to become SABC 3) as a continuity presenter, and worked his way up to sports presenting and news anchor. He worked on Morning Live on SABC 2 since its inception on 1 November 1999.

Death
Mbuli died of pulmonary embolism while watching a rugby game at the Free State Stadium, aged 46. More than one thousand people including dignitaries and celebrities attended his funeral service.

References

South African television presenters
South African radio presenters
Deaths from pulmonary embolism
Burials at Westpark Cemetery
2013 deaths
1967 births